Popejoy is a city in Franklin County, Iowa, United States. The population was 77 at the time of the 2020 census.

History
Popejoy was platted in 1880; it was originally called Carleton. Popejoy was incorporated in 1908.

Geography
Popejoy is located at  (42.594083, -93.427023).

Demographics

2010 census
As of the census of 2010, there were 79 people, 33 households, and 21 families living in the city. The racial makeup of the city was 98.7% White and 1.3% from two or more races.

There were 33 households, of which 27.3% had children under the age of 18 living with them, 57.6% were married couples living together, 3.0% had a female householder with no husband present, 3.0% had a male householder with no wife present, and 36.4% were non-families. 27.3% of all households were made up of individuals, and 9.1% had someone living alone who was 65 years of age or older. The average household size was 2.39 and the average family size was 3.00.

The median age in the city was 35.5 years. 25.3% of residents were under the age of 18; 3.8% were between the ages of 18 and 24; 31.6% were from 25 to 44; 22.8% were from 45 to 64; and 16.5% were 65 years of age or older. The gender makeup of the city was 50.6% male and 49.4% female.

2000 census
As of the census of 2000, there were 78 people, 33 households, and 22 families living in the city. The racial makeup of the city was 96.15% White, and 3.85% from two or more races.

There were 33 households, out of which 24.2% had children under the age of 18 living with them, 57.6% were married couples living together, 3.0% had a female householder with no husband present, and 33.3% were non-families. 21.2% of all households were made up of individuals, and 15.2% had someone living alone who was 65 years of age or older. The average household size was 2.36 and the average family size was 2.86.

In the city, the population was spread out, with 20.5% under the age of 18, 12.8% from 18 to 24, 25.6% from 25 to 44, 17.9% from 45 to 64, and 23.1% who were 65 years of age or older. The median age was 40 years. For every 100 females, there were 110.8 males. For every 100 females age 18 and over, there were 100.0 males.

The median income for a household in the city was $29,464, and the median income for a family was $35,625. Males had a median income of $28,333 versus $14,375 for females. The per capita income for the city was $13,666. There were no families and 6.3% of the population living below the poverty line, including no under eighteens and 10.0% of those over 64.

Education
Alden Community School District operates public schools serving the community.

References

Cities in Franklin County, Iowa
Cities in Iowa
1880 establishments in Iowa